Ryan Gibbons (born 13 August 1994) is a South African cyclist, who currently rides for UCI WorldTeam .

Career
Prior to starting his road racing career at junior level, Johannesburg-born Gibbons competed in mountain bike racing. He was named in the start list for the 2017 Giro d'Italia. Gibbons won the first stage of the first-ever Virtual Tour de France on 4 July 2020. The following month, he was named in the startlist for the Tour de France.

He qualified to represent South Africa at the 2020 Summer Olympics.

Major results

2013
 3rd  Team time trial, African Road Championships
2015
 KZN Autumn Series
4th Mayday Classic
4th Hibiscus Cycle Classic
7th PMB Road Classic
 6th 94.7 Cycle Challenge
2016
 4th Time trial, National Road Championships
 7th Coppa Bernocchi
2017
 1st  Overall Tour de Langkawi
1st  Points classification
1st Stage 5
 4th Road race, National Road Championships
2018
 2nd Time trial, National Road Championships
2019
 African Games
1st  Time trial
1st  Team time trial
2nd  Road race
 2nd Road race, National Road Championships
 African Road Championships
3rd  Time trial
4th Road race
 4th Cadel Evans Great Ocean Road Race
2020
 1st  Road race, National Road Championships
2021
 African Road Championships
1st  Road race
1st  Time trial
1st  Team time trial
1st  Mixed team relay
 1st  Time trial, National Road Championships
 1st Trofeo Calvia
 5th Vuelta a Murcia
  Combativity award Stage 20 Vuelta a España
2022
 2nd Trofeo Alcúdia – Port d'Alcúdia

Grand Tour general classification results timeline

References

External links

Gibbons Biography Statistics at InTheBunch
Ryan Gibbons at Tour de Lankawi at CyclingNews
Ryan Gibbons takes maiden victory at South African Elite Road Race at InTheBunch

1994 births
Living people
South African male cyclists
Competitors at the 2019 African Games
African Games medalists in cycling
African Games gold medalists for South Africa
African Games silver medalists for South Africa
White South African people
Olympic cyclists of South Africa
Cyclists at the 2020 Summer Olympics
Cyclists from Johannesburg
20th-century South African people
21st-century South African people